The men's 3 metre springboard diving competition at the 2002 Asian Games in Busan was held on 11 October at the Sajik Swimming Pool.

Schedule
All times are Korea Standard Time (UTC+09:00)

Results 
Legend
DNS — Did not start

Semifinal

Final

References 

2002 Asian Games Official Report, Pages 235–236
Results

Diving at the 2002 Asian Games